Odin Luras Bjørtuft (born 19 December 1998) is a Norwegian professional footballer who plays for Bodø/Glimt, as a defender.

References

External links
Odin Bjørtuft at NFF

1998 births
Living people
Norwegian footballers
Odds BK players
Eliteserien players
Norwegian Second Division players
Association football defenders
Sportspeople from Skien